Gabrk is a small village west of Pregarje in the Municipality of Ilirska Bistrica in the Inner Carniola region of Slovenia.

The local church in the settlement is dedicated to the Holy Trinity and belongs to the Parish of Pregarje.

References

External links 

Gabrk on Geopedia

Populated places in the Municipality of Ilirska Bistrica